Group Captain Brian Paddon DSO (24 August 190821 February 1967), was a Royal Air Force pilot who became a prisoner of war and successfully escaped from Colditz Castle during the Second World War.

Early life
Paddon was born in Carshalton, Surrey, the son of the Reverend Charles Salmon Paddon and his wife Nellie Symington Paddon. In the 1911 Census of Redruth in Cornwall, Paddon, aged two, is living with his parents at Lannarth Vicarage.

Royal Air Force service

Paddon joined the RAF on a short service commission as a pilot officer (on probation) in June 1929. He obtained his Royal Aero Club Aviator's Licence #10796 on 3 September 1932.

Paddon was shot down flying Bristol Blenheim L8827 of No. 40 Squadron RAF during an attack at Saint-Valéry-en-Caux on 6 June 1940 as part of the Battle of France. He was captured and became a prisoner of war.

Prisoner of war

After passing through the interrogation and transit camp of Dulag luft, he was first sent to Oflag IX-A/H at Spangenberg, before shortly afterwards leaving for Stalag Luft I at Barth, arriving there on 12 July 1940, where he became the Senior British Officer.

After several escape attempts from various camps, he was sent to Oflag IV-C at Colditz Castle, arriving there on 14 May 1941 with three other officers, including Airey Neave.

After several more attempts to escape, on 11 June 1942, he was sent to a court-martial at Stalag XX-A for insulting a German officer during one of his previous escape attempts. However, he managed to escape from his cell, and with the aid of other British prisoners of war, left the camp with a work party, slipped away and travelled to Danzig. He stowed away on a Swedish ship and successfully reached neutral Sweden on 18 June. He returned to the UK on 6 August 1942.

He was awarded the Distinguished Service Order and promoted to group captain. He was also awarded the Distinguished Flying Cross. Paddon retired from service on 10 November 1950.

Family life
Paddon married Sheila Mary Mansell in 1935, but she died in Malta on 23 September 1939.  They had two daughters.

He married again in 1948 to Anita Williams; they had three daughters both born in Rhodesia.

He later married Kay Paddon.

He died in retirement in Rhodesia in 1967.

References

1908 births
1967 deaths
Royal Air Force officers
English aviators
British World War II pilots
British World War II bomber pilots
British World War II prisoners of war
Prisoners of war held at Colditz Castle
World War II prisoners of war held by Germany
British escapees
Shot-down aviators
Companions of the Distinguished Service Order
Royal Air Force personnel who were court-martialled